Below are the names and numbers of the steam locomotives that comprised the BR Standard Class 7, or 'Britannia' Class that ran on the British Railways network.  They represented an attempt to standardise steam design for ease of maintenance and usage.  Celebrating key British historical figures, the class name was based upon a suggestion by Bishop Eric Treacy.

Fleet list

References

7
BR standard class 7
Railway locomotives introduced in 1951
Br Britannia Class Locomotives